Human life may refer to:

 Human life span, statistical measure of the average time a human being is expected to live
 Human Life Amendment, various proposals to amend the United States Constitution to prohibit abortion
 Human Life International, an American-based Roman Catholic activist anti-abortion organization
 The Human Life Review, a quarterly journal devoted to explorations of life issues, primarily abortion

See also
 
 Human, primates of the family Hominidae, and the only extant species of the genus Homo
 Human (disambiguation)
 Life (disambiguation)
 My Life (disambiguation)
 Vita (disambiguation)
 Meaning of life, questions pertaining to the significance of living or existence in general
 Personal life, the course of an individual's life
 Everyday life, the ways in which people typically act, think, and feel on a daily basis
 Human condition, the characteristics and key events that compose the essentials of human existence
 Human rights, principles or norms that describe certain standards of human behaviour and are regularly protected by law
 Beginning of human personhood, the moment when a human is first recognized as a person
 Biography, a detailed description or account of a person's life
 Autobiography, a self-written account of the life of oneself